Impatiens niamniamensis, common name Congo cockatoo, parrot impatiens or simply parrot plant, is a species of flowering plant in the family Balsaminaceae.

Description
This evergreen, perennial species has an erect, succulent, brown stem resembling wood. Leaves are simple, ovate-oblong or elliptical, spirally arranged, about 10 cm long.

This plant produces bright and colourful bird-shaped flowers (hence the common names Congo cockatoo and parrot plant) with a long, curled nectar spur. Fruits are explosive  capsules of about 14–16 mm.

Distribution and habitat
Impatiens niamniamensis comes from tropical Africa. It can be found from Cameroon throughout tropical Africa, up to Sudan and down to the Democratic Republic of the Congo.

Cultivation
This plant is widely cultivated. In temperate zones it requires protection from temperatures below . It needs a sheltered position in a partially shaded spot. Impatiens niamniamensis has gained the Royal Horticultural Society's Award of Garden Merit.

References

 GRIN
 The Plant List
 Data Base
 Royal Horticultural Society

External links
 Digital Botanic Garden

niamniamensis
Flora of Northeast Tropical Africa
Flora of West-Central Tropical Africa
Flora of East Tropical Africa
Flora of South Tropical Africa